Pielmeier is a surname. Notable people with the surname include:

John Pielmeier (born 1949), American playwright and screenwriter
Timo Pielmeier (born 1989), German ice hockey goaltender